The Eastern Kentucky Colonels women's basketball team is a women's college basketball team at Eastern Kentucky University (EKU), located in Richmond, Kentucky, United States. After having played women's basketball in the Ohio Valley Conference (OVC) since it began sponsoring women's sports in 1977, and also having been an OVC member since the conference's formation in 1948, EKU joined the ASUN Conference in July 2021. Home games are played at Alumni Coliseum.

History
Eastern Kentucky began play in 1971. They won the Kentucky Women's Intercollegiate Conference (KWIC) Tournament in 1972, 1973, 1974, 1975, and 1976. They joined the OVC when that conference started sponsoring women's sports in 1977. The Colonels have made the postseason four times, with two being in the NCAA Tournament (1997, 2005), one being in the WNIT (2002), and one being in the WBI (2013). As of the end of the 2015–16 season, they have an all-time record of 623–589.

In 2019, Samantha Williams was named the new head coach of the basketball program.

Postseason

NCAA tournament results
The Colonels have made the NCAA Division I women's basketball tournament twice. They have a record of 0-2.

References

External links